Rhodes High School is a school in the Western Cape, South Africa.

External links
 

Schools in Cape Town